Camp Cuddly Pines Powertool Massacre is a 2005 pornographic slasher comedy film released by Wicked Pictures. The film, originally released on September 14, 2005, is the first adult film to be released on the HD DVD format.

Plot 
The film is a comedic parody of horror films of its time, with a cross between The Texas Chainsaw Massacre and Friday the 13th. College students Kristen (Daniels) and Megan (Drake) are planning to attend a concert. After they hit a homeless man with their car, the girls and their friends are systematically murdered.

Cast 
 Stormy Daniels as Kirsten
 Jessica Drake as Megan
 Eric Masterson as Rayford
 Voodoo as Todd
 Tommy Gunn as Josh
 Keri Sable as Porn Slut
 Devon Michaels as Hillbilly Girl
 Nicole Sheridan as The Ring Girl
 Rita Faltoyano as Mental Inmate #1
 Rebecca Love as Mental Inmate #2
 Taryn Thomas as Mental Inmate #3
 Katja Kassin as Mental Inmate #4
 Kinzie Kenner as The Sister
 Cherokee as Spirit Guide
 Katie Morgan as Natalie
 Randy Spears as Sheriff
 Manuel Ferrara as Mental Orderly
 Scott Nails as Boyfriend
 Kris Slater as Scott
 Mike Horner as Caretaker/Killer

Reception 
A horror movie critic wrote:  ...although Daniels has the perfect swollen-sweater-girl look as the blonde ditz, it’s Drake who steals the show as her snarkier and more sensible companion. Among the men, veterans Randy Spears and Mike Horner have both made quite a reputation for their acting within the adult community – in both serious and humorous roles, sex and nonsex – and are as entertaining as expected. Meanwhile, Eric Masterson, the nominal male lead, plays a nebbishy film geek well, and Voodoo has a memorable comic turn as a jock/would-be tough guy.

Awards and nominations

References

External links
 
 
 

American slasher films
2005 films
American parody films
2000s English-language films
2000s pornographic films
Films shot in California
2005 comedy horror films
American comedy horror films
Direct-to-video horror films
Pornographic parody films of horror films
2000s American films